In Greek mythology, Epimetheus was the brother of Prometheus (traditionally interpreted as "foresight", literally "fore-thinker"), a pair of Titans who "acted  as representatives of mankind". They were the sons of Iapetus, who in other contexts was the father of Atlas. While Prometheus is characterized as ingenious and clever, Epimetheus is depicted as foolish.

Mythology

According to Plato's use of the old myth in his Protagoras (320d–322a), the twin Titans were entrusted with distributing the traits among the newly created animals. Epimetheus was responsible for giving a positive trait to every animal, but when it was time to give man a positive trait, lacking foresight he found that there was nothing left. Prometheus decided that humankind's attributes would be the civilising arts and fire, which he stole from Athena and Hephaestus. Prometheus later stood trial for his crime.  In the context of Plato's dialogue, "Epimetheus, the being in whom thought follows production, represents nature in the sense of materialism, according to which thought comes later than thoughtless bodies and their thoughtless motions."

According to Hesiod, who related the tale twice (Theogony, 527ff; Works and Days 57ff), Epimetheus was the one who accepted the gift of Pandora from the gods. Their marriage may be inferred (and was by later authors), but it is not made explicit in either text. In later myths, the daughter of Epimetheus and Pandora was Pyrrha, who married Deucalion, a descendant of Prometheus. Together they are the only two humans who survived the deluge. In some accounts, Epimetheus had another daughter, Metameleia, whose name means "regret of what has occurred" for those that do not plan ahead will only feel sorrow when calamity strikes. Others say that Epimetheus' wife was called Ephyra, daughter of Oceanus.

In modern culture
In his seminal book Psychological Types, in chapter X, "General description of the types", Carl Jung uses the image of Epimetheus (with direct reference to Carl Spitteler's Epimetheus) to refer to the false application of a mental function, as opposed to its whole, healthy, and creative use.

Epimetheus plays a key role in the philosophy of Bernard Stiegler, and in particular in terms of his understanding of the relation between technogenesis and anthropogenesis; according to Stiegler, it is significant that Epimetheus is entirely forgotten in the philosophy of Martin Heidegger.

Genealogy

Notes

References
 Fowler, R. L., Early Greek Mythography: Volume 1: Text and Introduction, Oxford University Press, 2000. . Google Books.
 Hard, Robin, The Routledge Handbook of Greek Mythology: Based on H.J. Rose's "Handbook of Greek Mythology", Psychology Press, 2004. . Google Books.
 Hesiod, Theogony, in The Homeric Hymns and Homerica with an English Translation by Hugh G. Evelyn-White, Cambridge, Massachusetts, Harvard University Press; London, William Heinemann Ltd., 1914. Online version at the Perseus Digital Library. Internet Archive.
 Kerényi, Karl, The Gods of the Greeks,  Thames and Hudson, London, 1951. Internet Archive.
 Yasumura, Noriko, Challenges to the Power of Zeus in Early Greek Poetry, Bloomsbury Academic, London, 2011. . Google Books.

External links
 

Titans (mythology)
Greek gods
Deeds of Zeus